Munapirtti  is an island in the municipality of Pyhtää, Finland.

Villages 
 Hinkaböle
 Malm
 Munapirtti
 Tuuski (De jure a part of Munapirtti)''

External links
The webpages of the island of Munapirtti, in Swedish and Finnish 

Finnish islands in the Baltic
Pyhtää
Landforms of Kymenlaakso